Hitterdal may refer to:

 Hitterdal, Minnesota
 Hitterdal, Norway

See also 
 Hitterdal Chapel
 Hitterdalen
 Hítardalur